The Big Love, is a non-fiction scandalous biographical account of an alleged love affair between actor Errol Flynn and then fifteen-year-old actress Beverly Aadland, as told by her mother, Florence Aadland.

The original 1961 edition was first published by Lancer Books. A Warner Books Edition was released in 1986.  This edition contained an epilogue by co-author Tedd Thomey, commenting on Florence Aadland's life and death, and her imprisonment. The Big Love was republished, along with supplemental materials, in 2018 by Spurl Editions.

The book was reviewed by William Styron, a reprint of which appears in This Quiet Dust, and Other Writings.

Stage adaptation
In 1991, actress Tracey Ullman played the part of Florence in a one-woman show by Brooke Allen based on the book.

References

1961 non-fiction books
Tracey Ullman
American biographies
Books about actors
Collaborative non-fiction books
Lancer Books books